Extensor pollicis muscle may refer to:

Extensor pollicis longus muscle, a skeletal muscle on the dorsal side of the forearm
Extensor pollicis brevis muscle, a skeletal muscle on the dorsal side of the forearm
Extensor brevis pollicis